Luis Sequera (born 8 May 1961) is a Venezuelan judoka. He competed in the men's half-lightweight event at the 1984 Summer Olympics.

References

1961 births
Living people
Venezuelan male judoka
Olympic judoka of Venezuela
Judoka at the 1984 Summer Olympics
Place of birth missing (living people)